LAPO is a Nigerian organisation with a microfinance bank dedicated to self-employment through microfinance and an NGO, a non-governmental, non-profit community development organization focused on the empowerment of the poor and the vulnerable.

LAPO focuses on assisting the poor, especially the women, in raising their socio-economic statuses. It not only acts as a microcredit institution, but also assists clients in overcoming problems beyond the lack of funds(Business capital), such as illiteracy and environmental degradation (which often aggravates poverty). Moreover, it aims to enhance leadership skills, literacy status and political participation among poor women. It empowers women by providing opportunities for them to learn income generating skills such as sewing, food processing and soap making.

History
In 1987, the Lift Above Poverty Organization (LAPO) started as a non-profit entity at Ogwashi-Uku in present-day Delta State. The Institution was established as a Non-Governmental Organization (NGO) by Godwin Ehigiamusoe  in response to the effects of the implementation of the Structural Adjustment Programme (SAP) in 1986. In 1991, the Ford Foundation gave a grant to LAPO. LAPO was formally incorporated as a non-profit, non-governmental organization with the Corporate Affairs Commission, a federal agency, in 1993. In 2004, LAPO scaled up as a sustainable and effective lending institution drawing inspiration from best practice model of Grameen and ASA methodology in Bangladesh.

In Nigeria, LAPO has partnered with the Grameen Bank. In 2010, LAPO transformed its Microfinance activities into a regulated microfinance bank, LAPO Microfinance Bank limited, while the remaining activities continued under the LAPO NGO.

In 2010, LAPO Microfinance Bank obtained the approval of the Central Bank of Nigeria (CBN) to operate as a state microfinance bank and in 2012, it got an approval as a national microfinance bank. It celebrated their one millionth client and one billion dollars cumulative disbursement in 2013. In 2014, LAPO MfB was awarded ‘Microfinance Bank of the Year 2013’ by BusinessDay and Leadership Newspaper.

Financial services provided
LAPO provides poor Nigerians with the following financial services:

Different types of loans
Regular loan (RL), obtained by LAPO members through their groups as capital for entrepreneurship.
Festival Business Loan (FBL), which enables the clients to fund business activities during festive periods.
Farming Loan, developed exclusively for food crop farmers, in which the disbursement and repayment schedules follow the pattern of activities in farming cycle.
Credit-for-shares, allowing the poor to acquire and manage shares or stocks in profitable companies.
Asset loans, which are designed for clients to invest in the acquisition of income generating assets such as commercial transportation and household appliances.

Savings programmes
There are also different types of savings programs for capital accumulation:

Regular savings. Clients make mandatory weekly deposits into their savings accounts at group meetings which serve as funds for investment in capital accumulation. Withdrawal is only allowed at termination of relationship with LAPO.
Voluntary savings, in order to aid clients with capital investment. Clients are motivated to set aside surplus funds, and so generate more funds by earning competitive interest rates on the balances.

APO has set up a few subsidiaries to help tackle poverty in Nigeria. LAPO Agricultural and Rural Development Initiative (LARDI) was established to improve the lives of the rural poor in Nigeria. It helps to generate youth employment, to promote infrastructural development, to facilitate farmer’s access to capital and physical inputs such as credit, storing and processing facilities, to acquire information on relevant farming issues and to improve the farmers and rural households’ health. Micro Investment Support Services (MISS) was set up to provide microcredit services t for income generating purposes. Academy for Microfinance and Enterprise Development (AMED) was established to provide training and technical services to LAPO Group and other microfinance institutions.

Positive impact
LAPO has helped many poor Nigerians to achieve their basic needs and a high percentage 66.7% of ex-clients indicated that the loan has helped them a lot.

Table 1: LAPO overall loan impact

Table 2: Effects of LAPO loan

Negative aspects of LAPO
35.7% of ex-clients face difficulty in paying their loans, and many (usually second-loan clients) also find that the loan is too small.

Table 3: Loan Repayment Experience

Table 4: Response to size of loan and number of loans provided

From May 2010 Kiva Microfinance suspended fundraising for loans from LAPO and is refunding LAPO loans on the site that have yet to be fully funded.

References

External links
LAPO's microfinance bank home page
LAPO's NGO home page
LAPO's profile at Grameen Bank
Withdrawal of LAPO Rating by MicroRate Aug 2009
New York Times front page Apr 13 2010

Microfinance organizations
Organizations established in 1987